

St Mary Peak / Ngarri Mudlanha is a mountain located in the Australian state of South Australia on the northwestern side of Ikara. It is located within the Ikara–Flinders Ranges National Park and the gazetted locality of Flinders Ranges, South Australia. It was for a time known as "St Mary's Peak", but was renamed according to guidelines deprecating the use of names implying possession.

The Adnyamathanha people have expressed concern with tourists trekking to the peak as they regard it as a sacred place and not to be visited. However, the peak and its surroundings may be accessed via a walking trail from Wilpena Resort along the north-east edge of the range outside of Ikara, or via a longer trail through the middle of the pound.

See also
List of mountains in Australia

References

External links
 Image of St Mary Peak and Wilpena Pound on Google Maps

Mountains of South Australia
Flinders Ranges
Far North (South Australia)